The 1977 Christchurch mayoral election was part of the New Zealand local elections held that same year. In 1977, election were held for the Mayor of Christchurch plus other local government positions. The polling was conducted using the standard first-past-the-post electoral method.

Background
Sitting mayor Hamish Hay was re-elected for a second term, defeating Labour Party challenger Alex Clark. Despite retaining the mayoralty the Citizens' Association lost ground on the city council however, resulting in the composition of the council at ten seats to nine in favour of the Labour Party.

Results
The following table gives the election results:

Ward results
Candidates were also elected from wards to the Christchurch City Council.

References

Mayoral elections in Christchurch
1977 elections in New Zealand
Politics of Christchurch
October 1977 events in New Zealand
1970s in Christchurch